Nick Hein (born April 24, 1984) is a German retired mixed martial artist and actor, who is best known for appearing in the German television show Diese Kaminskis. Before Hein became an actor, he was also a national judo champion and police officer. Hein is the author of the book titled "Polizei am Limit", and competed in the UFC, and competes in the Lightweight division.

Background 
Hein was born in Elsdorf and became interested in martial arts after watching a Bruce Lee movie. Instead of joining a Kung Fu class he signed up Judo, when he was six years old,  because there were no Kung Fu clubs in Elsdorf. He started boxing training in 2000 after he watched a UFC event on VHS. He attended his first MMA class in 2009 and fought his first amateur MMA competition in the same year while he was still in the Judo National team for Germany where skipped his training in Berlin for the Judo World Championship. After a failed bid for 2008 Olympics and a leg injury, Hein decided to transition to  MMA.

Judo career

Hein started training judo when he was six years old and he was a judoka for 20 years, and in the German team for a decade. He was the U-23 European Judo champion in 2006 and German national champion in 2006 and 2007. He has won more than 35 national and international judo medals.

Mixed martial arts career

Amateur career
Two years before turning professional in 2009, Hein debuted as an amateur on February 24, 2007, as he faced Ulf Fritzmann at MMA Berlin: Tournament 3. After three rounds of action, the bout was ruled a draw.

Ultimate Fighting Championship
With a 10-1 (1) record, Hein signed a contract with the UFC on March 31, 2014.

Hein made his promotional debut against Drew Dober on May 31, 2014, at UFC Fight Night: Munoz vs. Mousasi. He won the fight via unanimous decision.

Hein faced James Vick on November 22, 2014, at UFC Fight Night 57. Despite dropping Vick twice in the first round with punches, Hein lost the fight via unanimous decision.

Hein faced Łukasz Sajewski on June 20, 2015, at UFC Fight Night 69. He won the fight by unanimous decision.

Hein next faced promotional newcomer Yusuke Kasuya on September 27, 2015, at UFC Fight Night 75. He won the fight by unanimous decision.

Hein was scheduled to face Jon Tuck on May 8, 2016, at UFC Fight Night 87. However, just days before the event, Hein pulled out citing injury.

Hein next faced Tae Hyun Bang on September 3, 2016, at UFC Fight Night 93. He won the fight via unanimous decision (29-28, 30–28, 30–27).

Hein was expected to face promotional newcomer Zabit Magomedsharipov in a featherweight bout on September 2, 2017, at UFC Fight Night 115. However, Hein pulled out of the fight due to injury on 21 August from the event and replaced by Mike Santiago.

Hein faced Davi Ramos on May 12, 2018, at UFC 224. He lost the fight via rear-naked choke in the first round.

Hein faced Damir Hadžović on July 22, 2018, at UFC Fight Night 134. He lost the fight via split decision.

Hein was scheduled to face Luigi Vendramini on June 1, 2019, at UFC on ESPN+ 11. However, Vendramini pulled out of the bout in late April citing a knee injury and subsequent surgery. Hein remained on the card against Frank Camacho. He lost the fight via TKO in the second round.

On June 2, 2019, Hein announced his retirement from mixed martial arts.

Personal life 
Hein worked as a police officer for more than 11 years in the Federal Police in Cologne, Germany. He is known as ‘Judge Dredd’ by his colleagues in the Police force. He was also an actor, appearing in a German television show, Diese Kaminskis, in which he played as an undertaker.

Hein is married to his Japanese wife, Marie Suzuki, and they have a son, Noah. His sister was married to UFC fighter Drew Dober who he fought against at UFC Fight Night: Munoz vs. Mousasi.

Hein is the author of the book titled "Polizei am Limit" -  Police at the Limit" where he detailed the lack of resources and training in the Police force in Germany.

Hein, as a former police officer and UFC fighter, wrote an article on the New Year's Eve sexual assaults in Germany  on December 31, 2015, incident - the widespread sexual assaults, attacks and robberies which linked to the influx of asylum seekers occurred in Cologne, criticizing the political and legal system in Germany did not do enough to prevent such crimes. He was invited to appear on CNN, Russia Today (RT) and other TV stations to voice his condemnation of the attacks but thought help should be given to refugees who needed help.

Championships and accomplishments

Mixed martial arts 
 Fair Fighting Championship
 FFC Light Welterweight (161 lb) Championship (One time)
 FFA Western German Championship
 FFA Western German Middleweight (185lbs.) Champion (2009)

Jiu Jitsu 
 Choke Wars Welterweight (170lbs.) Champion (2013)
 Western German BJJ Middleweight (181lbs) Champion (2013)
 Tap or Snap Super Welterweight (176lbs.) Champion (2013)
 Tap or Snap Middleweight (187lbs.) Champion (2012)

Judo 
 European Judo Under-23 Half Middleweight (179lbs.) Champion (2006)
 German Judo Under-20 Half Middleweight (179lbs.) Champion (2003)
  European Judo Cadet Lightweight (161lbs.) Champion (2000)
 German Judo Under-15 Extra Lightweight (121lbs.) Champion (1998)

Mixed martial arts record

|Loss
|align=center|14–5 (1)
|Frank Camacho
|TKO (punches)
|UFC Fight Night: Gustafsson vs. Smith 
|
|align=center|2
|align=center|4:56
|Stockholm, Sweden
|
|-
|Loss
|align=center| 14–4 (1)
|Damir Hadžović
|Decision (split)
|UFC Fight Night: Shogun vs. Smith 
|
|align=center|3
|align=center|5:00
|Hamburg, Germany
|
|- 
|Loss
|align=center| 14–3 (1)
|Davi Ramos
|Submission (rear-naked choke)
|UFC 224
|
|align=center| 1
|align=center| 4:15
|Rio de Janeiro, Brazil
|
|-
|Win
|align=center|14–2 (1)
|Tae Hyun Bang
|Decision (unanimous)
|UFC Fight Night: Arlovski vs. Barnett
|
|align=center|3
|align=center|5:00
|Hamburg, Germany
|  
|-
|Win
|align=center| 13–2 (1)
|Yusuke Kasuya
| Decision (unanimous)
|UFC Fight Night: Barnett vs. Nelson
|
|align=center|3
|align=center|5:00
|Saitama, Japan
| 
|-
|Win
|align=center| 12–2 (1)
|Łukasz Sajewski
|Decision (unanimous)
|UFC Fight Night: Jędrzejczyk vs. Penne
|
|align=center| 3
|align=center| 5:00
|Berlin, Germany
|
|- 
|Loss
|align=center| 11–2 (1)
|James Vick
| Decision (unanimous)
|UFC Fight Night: Edgar vs. Swanson
|
|align=center|3 
|align=center| 5:00
|Austin, Texas, United States
|
|-
|Win
|align=center| 11–1 (1)
|Drew Dober
|Decision (unanimous)
|UFC Fight Night: Munoz vs. Mousasi
|
|align=center| 3
|align=center| 5:00
|Berlin, Germany
|
|-
|Win
|align=center| 10–1 (1)
|Michael Erdinc
|Decision (unanimous)
|Fair FC
|
|align=center| 3
|align=center| 5:00
|Herne, Germany
|
|-
|Win
|align=center| 9–1 (1)
|Musa Jangubaev
|TKO (punches)
|Respect Fighting Championship 10
|
|align=center| 2
|align=center| 3:51
|Wuppertal, Germany
|
|-
|Win
|align=center| 8–1 (1)
|Tamirlan Dadaev
|Decision (unanimous)
|Defenders FC 2
|
|align=center| 3
|align=center| 5:00
|Stuttgart, Germany
|
|-
|Win
|align=center| 7–1 (1)
|Robert Pastuch
|Decision (unanimous)
|Respect Fighting Championship 9
|
|align=center| 3
|align=center| 5:00
|Dormagen, Germany
|
|-
|NC
|align=center| 6–1 (1)
|Jordan Błoch
|NC (accidental cut)
|Respect Fighting Championship 7
|
|align=center| 1
|align=center| 1:12
|Essen, Germany
|
|-
|Win
|align=center| 6–1
|Patrick Herring
|Decision (unanimous)
|SFC 8: Tournament 2012 Part I
|
|align=center| 3
|align=center| 5:00
|Mainz, Germany
|
|-
|Loss
|align=center| 5–1
|Sebastian Risch
|TKO (knees)
|Respect Fighting Championship 6
|
|align=center| 2
|align=center| 4:05
|Wuppertal, Germany
|
|-
|Win
|align=center| 5–0
|Kamil Lipski
|Decision (unanimous)
|Respect Fighting Championship 4
|
|align=center| 3
|align=center| 5:00
|Herne, Germany
|
|-
|Win
|align=center| 4–0
|Kurt Verschueren
|Submission (rear-naked choke)
|OC: Cage Fight Night 7
|
|align=center| 1
|align=center| 1:46
|Koblenz, Germany
|
|-
|Win
|align=center| 3–0
|Stefan Heber
|Submission (americana)
|FFA: German Championships 2010
|
|align=center| 2
|align=center| 2:35
|Berlin, Germany
|
|-
|Win
|align=center| 2–0
|Milan Tomes
|Submission (rear-naked choke)
|Backstreet Fights 2: Rematch
|
|align=center| 2
|align=center| 1:03
|Cologne, Germany
|
|-
|Win
|align=center| 1–0
|Stefan Heber
|Submission (rear-naked choke)
|FFA: West German Championships 2009
|
|align=center| 1
|align=center| 3:25
|Viersen, Germany
|
|-

See also
 List of current UFC fighters
 List of male mixed martial artists

References

External links
 

1983 births
Living people
German male mixed martial artists
Welterweight mixed martial artists
Lightweight mixed martial artists
Mixed martial artists utilizing boxing
Mixed martial artists utilizing judo
Mixed martial artists utilizing Brazilian jiu-jitsu
German practitioners of Brazilian jiu-jitsu
German male judoka
German male television actors
German police officers
Sportspeople from Cologne
German Christians
Ultimate Fighting Championship male fighters